Bicknell is a town along State Route 24 in Wayne County, Utah, United States.  As of the 2010 census, the town population was 327.

History

Bicknell was originally called Thurber, or Thurber Town, for A.K. Thurber, who in 1879 built the first house in the area. In 1897 the town moved to a new location due to sandy soil and poor water conditions.

In 1914 Thomas W. Bicknell, a wealthy eastern author, historian, and Education Commissioner for Rhode Island, offered a thousand-volume library to any Utah town that would rename itself after him. The town of Grayson also wanted the library prize, so in a compromise in 1916, Grayson took the name of Blanding, Mr. Bicknell's wife's maiden name, as a tribute to her parents. The two towns split the library, each receiving 500 books.

Geography
The Fremont River flows through the valley, which lies between  Thousand Lake Mountain to the north and  Boulder Mountain to the south. Fishlake National Forest is to the north, and Dixie National Forest is to the south.

Distances
  northeast of Bryce Canyon National Park
  southwest of Price
  west of Moab
  south of Provo
  south of Salt Lake City
  northeast of St. George

Area sites
 Bicknell Bottoms wildlife habitat and fish hatchery ( SE)
 Boulder Mountain (SE)
 Capitol Reef National Park ( E)
 Fruita Schoolhouse ( E)
 Teasdale Tithing Office and Granary ( SE)
 Thousand Lake Mountain (NNE)

Climate
According to the Köppen Climate Classification system, Bicknell has a semi-arid climate, abbreviated "BSk" on climate maps.

Demographics

As of the census of 2000, there were 353 people, 126 households, and 95 families residing in the town.  The population density was 757.9 people per square mile (290.0/km2).  There were 143 housing units at an average density of 307.0 per square mile (117.5/km2).  The racial makeup of the town was 97.17% White, 0.28% Native American, 1.98% from other races, and 0.57% from two or more races. Hispanic or Latino of any race were 3.12% of the population.

There were 126 households, out of which 38.1% had children under 18 living with them, 62.7% were married couples living together, 8.7% had a female householder with no husband present, and 24.6% were non-families. 21.4% of all households were made up of individuals, and 10.3% had someone living alone who was 65 years of age or older.  The average household size was 2.80 and the average family size was 3.23.

In the town, the population was spread out, with 32.9% under 18, 9.3% from 18 to 24, 22.9% from 25 to 44, 17.6% from 45 to 64, and 17.3% who were 65 years of age or older.  The median age was 30 years. For every 100 females, there were 101.7 males.  For every 100 females aged 18 and over, there were 97.5 males.

The median income for a household in the town was $32,750, and the median income for a family was $34,500. Males had a median income of $29,750 versus $20,750 for females. The per capita income for the town was $13,457.  About 12.5% of families and 11.7% of the population were below the poverty line, including 13.6% of those under age 18 and 7.2% of those aged 65 or over.

See also

 List of cities and towns in Utah

References

External links

 Wayne County History @ Capitol Reef Country website

Towns in Utah
Towns in Wayne County, Utah
Populated places established in 1879
1879 establishments in Utah Territory